Cedar Creek is a  long 2nd order tributary to the Deep River in Moore, Randolph, and Chatham Counties, North Carolina.  This stream is one of two streams named Cedar Creek on the left bank of the Deep River.  The other Cedar Creek has its confluence in Chatham County.

Course
Cedar Ceeek Creek rises in a pond in Chatham County and then flows south into Moore County to join the Deep River about 1.5 miles northwest of High Falls, North Carolina.

Watershed
Cedar Creek Creek drains  of area, receives about 47.6 in/year of precipitation, and has a wetness index of 414.45 and is about 48% forested.

See also
List of rivers of North Carolina

References

Rivers of North Carolina
Rivers of Chatham County, North Carolina
Rivers of Moore County, North Carolina
Rivers of Randolph County, North Carolina